Alfred Ernest Moore (December 1, 1904 – June 29, 1979) was a Canadian professional ice hockey goaltender. Moore played 16 seasons of professional ice hockey between 1925 and 1942, including 21 games in the National Hockey League with the Chicago Black Hawks, New York Americans and Detroit Red Wings between 1937 and 1940

Playing career
During game one of the 1938 Stanley Cup Finals Moore replaced Mike Karakas in the Chicago Black Hawks net when replacement goaltender Paul Goodman did not arrive in Toronto on time. Moore held the Toronto Maple Leafs to one goal as Chicago won 3–1. After this game, he was declared ineligible by NHL president Frank Calder after Goodman arrived in Toronto. As the result of the Black Hawks Stanley Cup win, he was given a gold watch and $300 by Hawks management.

Moore began his professional career with Eddie Livingstone's Chicago Cardinals in 1926–27. He then played for Kitchener of the Can-Pro league. After Kitchener relocated he joined Toronto's IHL, but was traded to Cleveland of the IHL for Winston Fisher. At the end of the season, the New York Rangers claimed him in the inter-league draft. He was loaned by the Rangers to Springfield of the Can-Am for several seasons, then traded back to Cleveland in 1932. He signed as a free agent with New Haven of the Can-Am the following year. He was traded to the New York Americans in November 1936. He made his NHL debut for the Americans, a shutout against the Montreal Canadiens in January 1937. He was loaned to Chicago for game one of the 1938 Stanley Cup Final. In 1939, he was loaned to the Detroit Red Wings who sent him to Indianapolis of the IAHL but played for Red Wings when Tiny Thompson was hurt. The Americans sent him to Springfield in 1940 and he played out his career for several teams in the AHL, retiring after the 1941–42 season.

Career statistics

Regular season and playoffs

External links
 

1904 births
1979 deaths
Boston Cubs players
Buffalo Bisons (AHL) players
Canadian ice hockey goaltenders
Chicago Cardinals (ice hockey) players
Cleveland Barons (1937–1973) players
Cleveland Indians (IHL) players
Detroit Red Wings players
Hershey Bears players
Indianapolis Capitals players
Kitchener Flying Dutchmen players
Kitchener Millionaires players
New Haven Eagles players
New York Americans players
Ontario Hockey Association Senior A League (1890–1979) players
Philadelphia Arrows players
Philadelphia Rockets players
Pittsburgh Hornets players
Providence Reds players
Springfield Indians players
Ice hockey people from Toronto